Baseball was contested at the 1966 Central American and Caribbean Games in San Juan, Puerto Rico.

References
 

1966 Central American and Caribbean Games
1966
1966
Central American and Caribbean Games